This is a list of occasions, such as holidays and events, named after or commonly referred to by the calendar day on which they fall.

Holidays

Historical events

See also 

 Sansculottides: Six complementary days added to the French Republican Calendar to celebrate various virtues and the French Revolution.

Holiday lists
Lists of events